Amarna letter EA 330, titled: "Dirt at the Feet of the King" is an ovate-(squarish)-shaped, small-sized letter, from Šipṭi-Ba'la the mayor/ruler of Lachish (Tel Lachish), of the mid 14th century BC Amarna letters.

The Canaanite city-states were visited by the scribes, with short 'status reports' sent to the Pharaoh (King) reporting on city or regional accounts, for example the troubles with the habiru, or other external affairs. Many of the Canaanite letters are short, with some nearly identical phraseology of words, as well as the layout of the individual clay tablet letters.

The Amarna letters, about 300, numbered up to EA 382, are a mid 14th century BC, about 1350 BC and 20–25 years later, correspondence. The initial corpus of letters were found at Akhenaten's city Akhetaten, in the floor of the Bureau of Correspondence of Pharaoh; others were later found, adding to the body of letters.

Letter EA 330 is located at the British Museum.

The letter
Letter 330 is short, the Obverse containing only 10 lines; the Reverse 11. Lines 1-8 of the Obverse is the letter introduction, with the message to the King (Pharaoh), starting at line 9, Obverse.

One distinction of the Introduction, many vassal state letters (from the city-states) use the phraseology: "7 and 7 times again, ... I bow down". (I address you (Pharaoh), over-and-over again.) In some Amarna letters, EA 64, EA 282, and this letter, EA 330, an addition is made to the cuneiform text, by adding the wording for "to flood", (Akkadain mīlu.) Namely "7 and 7 times again, over-flowing, ... I bow down". (Flooding (mīlu), is also used in EA 359, the King of Battle saga.)

Cuneiform score (CDLI listing), Akkadian, English

Obverse
Paragraph I of II

segue
9. (P. II) Ù yi-di-mi _lugal_-ru
___U, – idû Ŝarruru
___And, – know _King_
10. _EN_-ia i-nu-ma
___Bēlu-ia, — enūma
___Lord-mine, — Now, (at this time)

Bottom
11.iš#-te-mi gáb-bi
___šemû gabbu
___I heard all
12.[ a ]-wa-at, _lugal_-ri
___amatu, – _lugal_-ri
___the words (the report), – _King_ri

Reverse

13. _EN_-ia, — ša-ni-tú
___ _Bēlu_-ia
___ _Lord_-mine
13.5----------ša-ni-tú a-mur-mi
___—————šanitam, —
___-------------Furthermore, — Look (here) –
14.
—-
—- 1Yanhamu

See also
Tel Lachish
Amarna letters–phrases and quotations

References

Moran, William L. 1987, 1992. The Amarna Letters. Johns Hopkins University Press, 1987, 1992. 393 pages.(softcover, ISBN 0-8018-6715-0)
 Parpola, 1971. The Standard Babylonian Epic of Gilgamesh, Parpola, Simo, Neo-Assyrian Text Corpus Project, c 1997, Tablet I thru Tablet XII, Index of Names, Sign List, and Glossary-(pp. 119–145), 165 pages.
Rainey, 1970. El Amarna Tablets, 359-379, Anson F. Rainey, (AOAT 8, Alter Orient Altes Testament 8, Kevelaer and Neukirchen -Vluyen), 1970, 107 pages.

Amarna letters
Canaan